Country Club Hill Historic District is a national historic district  located at Bluefield, Mercer County, West Virginia.  The district includes 51 contributing buildings in a residential area of South Bluefield. The buildings are primarily large single family residences with generous front and rear yards.  The properties were mostly developed prior to 1940, and are representative of popular architectural styles including Colonial Revival, Classical Revival, and Bungalow styles.  The Bluefield Country Club (1920) and some of the houses were designed by architect Alex B. Mahood.

It was listed on the National Register of Historic Places in 1992.

References

American Craftsman architecture in West Virginia
Bungalow architecture in West Virginia
Neoclassical architecture in West Virginia
Colonial Revival architecture in West Virginia
Historic districts in Bluefield, West Virginia
National Register of Historic Places in Mercer County, West Virginia
Historic districts on the National Register of Historic Places in West Virginia